Neil Piccinelli (born 4 March 1967) is an Australian former professional rugby league footballer who played in the 1980s and 1990s.

He played with the Illawarra Steelers, Hunter Mariners and the Newcastle Knights.
Most notable was his stint with the Steelers from 1989–1996. He was named in an Illawarra 25th anniversary "Team of Steel" at second-row.

Playing career
Piccinelli made his first grade debut for Illawarra against St George in Round 1 1989.  In 1992, Illawarra finished 3rd on the table and qualified for its first ever finals campaign.  Piccinelli played in all 3 finals games as Illawarra reached the preliminary final but fell short of a maiden grand final appearance losing to St George 4–0.

Piccinelli played with Illawarra up until the end of 1996 and then joined the Hunter Mariners for the 1997 Super League season.  Piccinelli played 17 games for the club in their one and only season before they were liquidated.

In 1998, Piccinelli joined defending premiers Newcastle in the reunified NRL competition.  Piccinelli's final game in first grade was the elimination final loss against Canterbury during the 1998 finals series.

References

External links
Neil Piccinelli Yesterdays Hero
 

1967 births
Living people
Australian rugby league players
Illawarra Steelers players
Hunter Mariners players
Newcastle Knights players
Rugby league second-rows
Place of birth missing (living people)